Antoinette Olympe Bradna (12 August 1920 – 5 November 2012) was a French dancer and actress, who emigrated to the United States where she lived for the rest of her life.

Early years
Bradna was born in a dressing room in the Olympic Theatre in Paris, and her full name was Antoinette Olympe Bradna. Her father, Joseph Bradna, was a Bohemian Czech and her mother, Jana Bradna, was Austrian German. (Another source says that her mother was French.) They were circus performers before Olympe began her career. (Jana Bradna had been an opera singer before she joined her husband in the circus.) Her aunt Ella Bradna also was in the circus, as an equestrienne. An item in a newspaper in 1936 reported that Bradna "followed a line of trained dogs on the stage in France, when she was only 18 months old."

Dancing
Bradna appeared at 18 months of age with her parents, who were world-famous bare back riders. By the time she was 8, Bradna "had attracted so much attention that agents were anxious to book her as a 'single.'" Her parents accompanied her to Sweden, Norway, Germany, Switzerland, Italy, and France as she danced. She performed "an acrobatic dance" in the Paris, France, production of Hit the Deck.

Later she joined the Folies Bergère. She was with that group for eight months and danced at the French Casino in New York City for eight more months.

She danced in Stockholm, New York City, and other world capitals.

Film

Bradna started her film career in France, then, in 1934, moved to Hollywood, California where she saw her greatest success,  signing a seven-year contract with Paramount Pictures. In 1935, she was one of seven young women "named by Paramount ... as possible screen stars of the future." She was one of six newcomers selected by Paramount in December 1935 to appear in a planned musical. Her screen debut came in Three Cheers for Love (1936). In 1936, she appeared in College Holiday. Later, branching out from musicals to more serious films, she had roles in The Last Train from Madrid and Souls at Sea.

During her career she appeared in more than a dozen films and was seen opposite such notable film stars as Ronald Reagan, George Raft and Gary Cooper.

Early retirement, later years
In May, 1941 Olympe married Douglas Woods Wilhoit, at which point she retired from acting. For many years she and her family lived in Stockton, California, before ultimately settling in Lodi, California. Together, she and Douglas would have four children, five grandchildren and eight great-grandchildren. They were married for over seventy years, with Douglas passing away in February, 2012, just nine months prior to Olympe's death.

Death
Bradna died 5 November 2012, in Stockton, California, at age 92. (Another source says, "... Bradna died at her home in San Joaquin, California ...) She was survived by a son, two daughters, five grandchildren, and eight great-grandchildren.

Filmography

References

Further reading
 Dye, David. Child and Youth Actors: Filmography of Their Entire Careers, 1914-1985. Jefferson, NC: McFarland & Co., 1988, p. 24.

External links

 
 
 Image of actresses Betty Burgess and Olympe Bradna shaking hands, Los Angeles, 1935. Los Angeles Times Photographic Archive (Collection 1429). UCLA Library Special Collections, Charles E. Young Research Library, University of California, Los Angeles. 

1920 births
2012 deaths
French film actresses
French female dancers
Actresses from Paris
French emigrants to the United States
French people of Czech descent
French people of Austrian descent